Peter Anthony Woods (born 21 January 1950) is an English former professional footballer who played as a midfielder or left back in the Football League for Southend United and Doncaster Rovers.

Life and career
Woods was born in 1950 in Sale, which was then in Cheshire. He joined Manchester United from school, and turned professional in 1967, but had not played for the first team when, in April 1970, he joined Second Division club Luton Town as part of a £35,000 deal that also took Don Givens, Ken Goodeve and Jimmy Ryan to the club. He spent 18 months at Luton without making a first-team appearance, and joined Southend United in February 1972 for a £3000 fee. He played 27 matches before moving on to Doncaster Rovers in 1973, where he scored twice in 55 matches in a two-year spell.

References

1950 births
Living people
People from Sale, Greater Manchester
Footballers from Greater Manchester
English footballers
Association football midfielders
Association football defenders
Manchester United F.C. players
Luton Town F.C. players
Southend United F.C. players
Doncaster Rovers F.C. players
English Football League players